B1A4 is a South Korean boy band formed by WM Entertainment. The group debuted on April 23, 2011 with the single "O.K" from the EP Let's Fly, after being introduced to the public through a webtoon. They have released nine studio albums (four Korean and five Japanese) and seven EPs, as well as four compilation albums. The group has had considerable commercial and critical success in both the Korean and Japanese markets. They have also toured in the United States.

History

Pre-debut
Baro, the rapper of the group, was scouted by a company representative who came across his photo posted on his friend's homepage on the social network Cyworld. At his audition, Baro sang Sumi Jo's "Once I Leave" and Sung Si-kyung's "The Road to Me", as well as rapping and beatboxing. The group's leader Jinyoung was similarly discovered from a photo posted on Cyworld. He received training in composition, singing, and acting. Gongchan was also discovered on Cyworld as a result of his winning an "Ulzzang Challenge" when he was in middle school. Main vocalist Sandeul was approached by a company agent after performing a song by Kim Yeon-woo in a talent show. Prior to their debut, the group underwent a training period of two years.

2011: Let's Fly and It B1A4
On April 11, the members of B1A4 were introduced through a webtoon. Initially, it was believed that B1A4 would be a mixed gender group due to the presence of a female character named Anna in the webtoon. The same day, WM Entertainment revealed a photo of the first member of the group, leader Jinyoung. The remaining members Baro, Gongchan, Sandeul, and CNU were revealed on a daily basis between April 12–15. A music video teaser for B1A4's promotional single "O.K" was uploaded on April 19. The full music video, as well as their debut EP Let's Fly, was released on April 21. The group made their debut performance on the April 23 episode of MBC's Show! Music Core. They had their subsequent debut stages on Mnet's M! Countdown, KBS' Music Bank, and SBS' The Music Trend on April 28, April 29, and May 1, respectively. B1A4 began promoting "Only Learned the Bad Things" on June 18, 2011. The group, alongside Block B, starred on SBS MTV's reality show Match Up. It began to air on June 22. The music video for the second promotional single "Only Learned the Bad Things" was aired on the first episode.

B1A4's second EP, It B1A4, and its lead single "Beautiful Target" were released on September 15, 2011. The group promoted the album on Music Bank, Show! Music Core, The Music Trend, and M! Countdown. B1A4 began promoting "My Love" on November 18.

In October 2011, it was announced that B1A4 would debut in Japan under the record label Pony Canyon in January 2012. Prior to their debut there, the group held their B1A4 – Japan Showcase Live 2011 at the Sinagawa Stellar Ball in Tokyo on December 9, 2011; the tickets for the event sold-out within one minute, an unprecedented feat for newly debuted groups. B1A4 performed nine songs at the event, which was attended by 1,000 people. At the end of the year, B1A4 won the Rookie of the Year Award at Tower Records' K-Pop Lovers! Awards 2011.

2012: Debut in Japan—first solo concert

Before entering the Japanese music industry, B1A4 released a compilation album on January 25, 2012, which consists of all the tracks previously included on Let's Fly and It B1A4 in Japan.

On March 5, B1A4 released the digital single "This Time Is Over" ahead of the release of their first studio album. B1A4 released Ignition and the promotional single "Baby I'm Sorry" on March 14, and they began promoting the song on M! Countdown the following the day, followed by performances on Music Bank, Show! Music Core, and The Music Trend. A repackaged edition of the album entitled Ignition: Special Edition, as well as the promotional single "Baby Good Night", was released on May 23.

B1A4 released their first Japanese-language single "Beautiful Target" on June 27, 2012. The song debuted at number four on the Oricon weekly singles chart, selling 32,665 in its first week. On July 25, B1A4 took part in season six of the reality show Hello Baby, where the group learns to care for children. On August 29, B1A4 released their second Japanese-language single "Oyasumi Good Night", which also debuted at number four on the Oricon weekly singles chart, selling 35,779 in its first week. They released their debut Japanese-language studio album 1 on October 24, 2012; it debuted at number five on the Oricon weekly albums chart, selling 20,547 in its first week.

Their third EP, In the Wind, was released on November 12, 2012; they began performing the promotional single "Tried to Walk" on M! Countdown on November 15, as well as on Music Bank, Show! Music Core, and The Music Trend the following days.

Tickets for B1A4's first solo concert, BABA B1A4, went on sale on October 18, 2012. The concert was co-produced by WM Entertainment and CJ E&M's global concert brand, M-Live. Before ticket sales began, 75,000 people were on the server waiting to buy the tickets resulting in 8,000 tickets to be sold out in 5 minutes once ticket sales opened. From December 8–9, 2012, B1A4 held their first solo concert BABA B1A4 at the SK Olympic Handball Gymnasium.

2013–2014: What's Happening?—First US tour 

On January 7, 2013, the Recording Industry Association of Japan released the list of winners for the 2013 Japan Gold Disc Awards where the group won two awards. In the same month, BABA B1A4 in Japan was held in two cities, with four shows held between the 27th and the 30th.

The single "What's Going On?", from B1A4's fourth EP What's Happening?, won the top spot on MBC Show! Music Core chart in May, marking the group's first music show win.

On June 19, 2013, WM Entertainment announced B1A4's 2nd solo concert, Amazing Store. After tickets went on sale on June 26, the concert sold out its 10,000 seats in under 5 minutes. The concert took place from August 7–11 at the Uniqlo AX to an audience of 2,000 each day.

The group released their second Korean studio album Who Am I and the title song "Lonely" on January 13, 2014. They held their third solo concert, titled 2014 B1A4 Concert The Class, on February 15–16 at the SK Olympic Handball Stadium at Olympic Park.

B1A4 released their 5th mini album with the title track "Solo Day" on July 14 and their first performance for "Solo Day" on July 17 on M! Countdown. It was announced that B1A4 would be appearing at 'The 12th Korea Times Music Festival' and KCON 2014 in Los Angeles, California.
 WM Entertainment also announced B1A4's first world tour 'Road Trip'. Their first concert took place in Taiwan on August 23, 2014 and Shanghai on August 30, 2014, then the boys headed on over to Manila on September 6, 2014, Melbourne on September 18, 2014, and Sydney on September 20, 2014. The boys also performed in New York on October 3, 2014, Chicago on October 5, 2014, Dallas on October 8, 2014, and San Francisco on October 11, 2014.

2015: Solo activities, Sweet Girl, and B1A4 Adventure World Tour 

In 2015, Jinyoung appeared in the Mnet drama Persevere, Goo Hae Ra. He was also cast in MBC's Warm and Cozy alongside Yoo Yeon-seok and Kang So-ra. CNU was cast in a musical called Chess with 2AM's Jo Kwon, VIXX's Ken and SHINee's Key, while Sandeul appeared as a panelist on the talent show King of Mask Singer, as well as on KBS2's Immortal Song 2. Baro was cast as Hong Song-tae in the drama series Angry Mom. Baro and Sandeul both appeared as themselves in the web drama Loss:Time:Life, while Gongchan hosted for the fourth season of KBS' A Song for You alongside f(x)'s Amber and Super Junior's Kangin.

B1A4 released their sixth EP, Sweet Girl, on August 10, 2015, four days after they debuted a number of tracks during a Guerrilla Concert.

The B1A4 Adventure World Tour began in Seoul on September 12 and 13, 2015, continuing on to Dallas, Texas on November 8, Mexico on November 11, Puerto Rico on November 13, Hong Kong on November 29, Helsinki on December 9, Berlin on December 11, Madrid on December 13, Bogota on February 12, 2016, Santiago on February 14, and Lima on February 17, 2016.

On December 10, they released the single "It's Christmas".

2016–2018: Continued solo activities, Jinyoung and Baro leaving WM Entertainment
In 2016, B1A4's members appeared in a number of acting roles and reality show appearances, as well as producing and appearing on soundtracks. Jinyoung was cast in the KBS drama Love in the Moonlight alongside Park Bo-gum and Kim Yoo-jung. Jinyoung also produced a track for the drama's soundtrack titled "Foggy Road", which was performed by Ben. Jinyoung also produced multiple tracks for the reality contest Produce 101. CNU appeared on the soundtrack for tvN's Cinderella and the Four Knights with the song "The Way To Find Love". Baro was cast in KBS's Master: God of Noodles. Sandeul again appeared on Immortal Song 2, and competed on the special Idol Cooking King and made it into the top 8. He also performed a duet with VIXX's Ken on Duet Song Festival's November 11 episode. Sandeul also made his solo debut with the release of his mini-album Stay as You Are on October 4. Gongchan appeared on MBC's Celebrity Bromance with VIXX's Hongbin. Jinyoung and CNU both competed on King of Masked Singer. Additionally, CNU and Sandeul were both cast as D'artagnan in the musical Three Musketeers.

On June 4, they performed as a group alongside other artists at the 2016 Dream Concert. On June 11, they held a concert with label-mates Oh My Girl in Beijing. B1A4 also performed at the 2016 Busan One Asia Festival in October. They were in the event's first lineup alongside CNBLUE, Apink, Girl's Day and B.A.P.

On November 28, 2016, B1A4 released their third Korean studio album, Good Timing, and the music video for its lead single "A Lie". They also held their first showcase since debut, performing songs from their new album as well as previous hits. Their first comeback stage was on Show Champion on November 30. After their comeback, B1A4 competed as a group on Immortal Songs 2.

In 2017, B1A4 performed in Seoul for their concert "B1A4 Live Space 2017" on February 4, 5, 11 and 12. Shortly after, they held their second US tour titled "B1A4 Four Nights in The U.S. 2017", with concerts in New York on February 15; Chicago on February 17; San Francisco on February 19; and Los Angeles on February 20. In May 2017, CNU was cast to play the lead in the Korean version of the musical adaptation of Hamlet. The band toured Japan as "B1A4 Live Space 2017" with concerts in Osaka on May 22; Okazaki on June 8, Fukuoka on June 9, and Tokyo on June 15.

On September 25, 2017, B1A4 released their seventh EP Rollin'.

On June 30, 2018, WM Entertainment confirmed that Jinyoung and Baro had left the agency following the end of their contracts, while the others renewed with the agency. Their activities with the group remain in discussion. On November 16, WM Entertainment has announced that B1A4 members Jinyoung and Baro will not promote with the group for the time being, with the remaining three members - CNU, Sandeul and Gongchan - to continue promoting as B1A4.

2019–present: Military enlistments and Origine 
On January 22, 2019, CNU enlisted in the military as an active duty soldier.  He was officially discharged on August 28, 2020.

On September 29, 2020, WM Entertainment announced that B1A4 would be making a comeback with their fourth Korean studio album Origine and its lead single "Like A Movie" on October 19, 2020.

On April 23, 2021, B1A4 released the digital single "10 Times" to commemorate the group's 10th anniversary.

On November 11, 2021, Sandeul enlisted in the military as a social worker.  Before his enlistment, B1A4 released a new digital single titled "Adore You" on November 10. On March 14, 2023, CNU was announced to have renewed his contract with WM Entertainment, while Gongchan was confirmed by WM to be exempted from serving in the military due to health reasons.

Public image
The group has been dubbed "countryside-dols" (countryside idols) by the Korean media due to the fact that all of the members of B1A4 are from the countryside: Jinyoung is from Chungju, North Chungcheong Province; CNU from Cheongju, North Chungcheong Province; Sandeul from Busan; Baro from Gwangju, South Jeolla Province; and Gongchan from Suncheon, South Jeolla Province. They were also referred to as "blood-dols" (blood idols) in reference to the origins of their name (which references the group members' blood types), as well as "paper-dols" (paper idols) because of the paper classification A4. In an effort to distinguish themselves, B1A4 had also promoted a nickname "saessakdol" ("sprout-dol") and created a so-called "saessakchum" ("sprout dance"), which was showcased in various shows including Quiz to Change the World.

In January 2015, B1A4 members hugged Muslim female fans in a meet and greet session in Malaysia. Internet commenters called for the organizers to be charged afterwards.

Philanthropy
B1A4 have participated in philanthropic acts throughout their career.

On May 31, 2012, it was reported that B1A4 had visited a fan's home to prepare a meal and help take care of the fan's ill mother. On August 31 that year, the group donated 140 kg of rice garlands initially donated by fans to Seoul SOS Youth Camp in Yangcheon District. On September 1, 2012, B1A4 held a mini concert at the Wonju Market to help raise awareness for traditional markets. As they hosted their first solo concert, BABA B1A4, fans from all over the world sent gifts and donations to B1A4, which the group then donated to charity.

On July 19, 2013, as B1A4 prepared for their second solo concert, B1A4 asked fans for school supplies rather than flower wreaths. They were working with CJ Group’s charity foundation “Donor’s Camp” to support the education of children who are in need.

The group donated part of the proceeds from their third solo concert to Seoul Arts College's matriculation ceremony, which took place on February 27, 2014 at the Olympic Park Olympic Hall. Seoul Arts College used the donation to purchase rice to be given to the charities Gangnam Start Center and Gangnam Vision Center. In December that year, they participated in a charity event to raise funds to provide those in need with coal briquettes for heating.

Discography

Korean albums
 Ignition (2012)
 Who Am I (2014)
 Good Timing (2016)
 Origine (2020)

Japanese albums
 1 (2012)
 2 (2014)
 3 (2016)
 4 (2017)
 5 (2018)

Filmography
 MTV Match Up (2011)
 B1A4's Selca Diary (2012)
 B1A4's Real Player (2012)
 B1A4's Hello Baby Season 6 (2012)
 Wide Entertainment News (2013)
 B1A4's One Fine Day (2014)
 ''A Song For You (2015)

Concerts and tours

Korean tours

 2012: BABA B1A4 
 2013: Limited Show [Amazing Store]
 2014: THE CLASS
 2015: B1A4 ADVENTURE
 2017 : LIVE SPACE

Japanese tours

 2013: BABA B1A4 in Japan
 2013: Limited Show [Amazing Store] in Japan (Zepp Tour)
 2014: Listen To The B1A4 (Arena Tour)
 2016: The Great World Of B1A4
 2017: Be The One
 2018: Paradise

World tours

 2014: B1A4 Road Trip - Ready?
 2015-2016: B1A4 ADVENTURE
 2017: 4 Nights In The U.S

Awards and nominations

References

External links

  
 B1A4's profile at WM Entertainment

 
Japanese-language singers of South Korea
K-pop music groups
Musical groups established in 2011
Pony Canyon artists
Universal Music Japan artists
South Korean dance music groups
South Korean boy bands
Musical groups from Seoul
WM Entertainment artists
2011 establishments in South Korea